The National Transportation Safety Board (NTSB) is an independent U.S. government investigative agency responsible for civil transportation accident investigation. In this role, the NTSB investigates and reports on aviation accidents and incidents, certain types of highway crashes, ship and marine accidents, pipeline incidents, bridge failures, and railroad accidents. The NTSB is also in charge of investigating cases of hazardous materials releases that occur during transportation. The agency is based in Washington, D.C. It has four regional offices, located in Anchorage, Alaska; Denver, Colorado; Ashburn, Virginia; and Seattle, Washington. The agency also operates a national training center at its Ashburn facility.

History

The origin of the NTSB was in the Air Commerce Act of 1926, which assigned the United States Department of Commerce responsibility for investigating domestic aviation accidents. Before the NTSB, the Federal Aviation Administration's (FAA; at the time the CAA) independence was questioned as it was investigating itself and would be biased to find external faults, coalescing with the 1931 crash killing Notre Dame coach Knute Rockne. The USA's first "independent" Air Safety Board was established in 1938: it lasted only fourteen months. In 1940, this authority was transferred to the Civil Aeronautics Board's newly formed Bureau of Aviation Safety.

In 1967, Congress created a separate cabinet-level Department of Transportation, which among other things, established the Federal Aviation Administration as an agency under the DOT. At the same time, the NTSB was established as an independent agency which absorbed the Bureau of Aviation Safety's responsibilities. However, from 1967 to 1975, the NTSB reported to the DOT for administrative purposes, while conducting investigations into the Federal Aviation Administration, also a DOT agency.

To avoid any conflict, Congress passed the Independent Safety Board Act, and on April 1, 1975, the NTSB became a fully independent agency. , the NTSB has investigated over 140,000 aviation incidents and several thousand surface transportation incidents.

Organization
Formally, the "National Transportation Safety Board" refers to a five-manager investigative board whose five members are nominated by the President and confirmed by the Senate for five-year terms. No more than three of the five members may be from the same political party. One of the five board members is nominated as the Chair by the President and then approved by the Senate for a fixed 2-year term; another is designated as vice-chair and becomes acting chair when there is no formal chair. This board is authorized by Congress under Chapter 11, Title 49 of the United States Code to investigate civil aviation, highway, marine, pipeline, and railroad accidents and incidents. This five-member board is authorized to establish and manage separate sub-offices for highway, marine, aviation, railroad, pipeline, and hazardous materials investigations.

Since its creation, the NTSB's primary mission has been "to determine the probable cause of transportation accidents and incidents and to formulate safety recommendations to improve transportation safety (in the USA)". Based on the results of investigations within its jurisdiction, the NTSB issues formal safety recommendations to agencies and institutions with the power to implement those recommendations. The NTSB considers safety recommendations to be its primary tool for preventing future civil transportation accidents. However, the NTSB does not have the authority to enforce its safety recommendations.

Current board members

President Joe Biden nominated board member Jennifer Homendy to serve as the next Senate-confirmed chair on the retirement of Robert Sumwalt in 2021. She was sworn in as Chairwoman on August 13, 2021. On August 3, 2022, President Joe Biden nominated former Jacksonville Mayor Alvin Brown to the board for a term expiring December 31, 2026.

Accident and incident investigations

The NTSB is the lead agency in investigating a civil transportation accident or incident within its sphere. An investigation of a major accident within the United States typically starts with the creation of a "go team," composed of specialists in fields relating to the incident who are rapidly deployed to the incident location. The "go team" can have as few as three people or as many as a dozen, depending on the nature of the incident. The agency may then hold public hearings on the issue following the investigation. Ultimately, it will publish a final report which may include safety recommendations based on its findings. The NTSB has no legal authority to implement or impose its recommendations. Its recommendations are often implemented by regulators at the federal or state level or by individual transportation companies.

Jurisdiction over investigations
Aviation The NTSB has primary authority to investigate every civil aviation accident in the United States; the agency is also authorized to conduct investigations involving both civilian and military aircraft "with the participation of appropriate military authorities". For certain accidents, due to resource limitations, the Board will ask the FAA to collect the factual information at the scene of the accident; the NTSB bases its report on that information.
Surface Transportation The NTSB has the authority to investigate all highway accidents and incidents, including incidents at railway grade crossings, "in cooperation with a State". The NTSB has primary jurisdiction over railway accidents and incidents which result in death or significant property damage, or which involve a passenger train.
Marine For marine investigations, jurisdiction into investigations is divided between the NTSB and the U.S. Coast Guard. The division of investigative jurisdiction and responsibilities is prescribed in a detailed Memorandum of Understanding between the two agencies.
Pipeline The NTSB has primary jurisdiction over pipeline incidents (often the result of third-party excavation damage) which involve "a fatality, substantial property damage, or significant injury to the environment". 
Assistance to criminal investigations The NTSB has primary jurisdiction over civil transportation investigations, not criminal ones. If the Attorney General declares the case to be linked to a criminal act, the NTSB must relinquish control of the investigation to the Federal Bureau of Investigation. The NTSB may still provide technical support to the FBI in such investigations. In two high-profile examples, the NTSB sent aviation accident investigators with knowledge of aircraft structures and flight recorders to assist the FBI's criminal investigation into the murder-suicide of Pacific Southwest Airlines Flight 1771 in 1987, and the September 11, 2001, attacks fourteen years later.
Assistance to other domestic agencies In addition to assisting the Department of Justice in criminal investigations, the NTSB has also assisted the National Aeronautics and Space Administration (NASA) in its investigations of both the Challenger and the Columbia Space Shuttle disasters. The NTSB can also assist the U.S. military in investigating military incidents within the realm of the NTSB's expertise, such as the crash of an Air Force transport plane in former Yugoslavia that took the lives of more than 30 Americans, including Commerce Secretary Ron Brown.
Assistance to foreign governments The NTSB may assist in incident or accident investigations outside the United States under certain circumstances. These may include accidents or incidents involving American-registered or American-owned civil aircraft or aircraft with U.S.-manufactured components in foreign air space. Officially, NTSB employees are prohibited from releasing information about "another country's investigation".

Use of the "party system"
To conduct its investigations, the NTSB operates under the "party system", which utilizes the support and participation of industry and labor representatives with expertise or technical knowledge specifically useful to its investigation. The NTSB may invite these individuals or organizations to become parties to the investigation and participate under the supervision of the NTSB. The NTSB has discretion over which organizations it allows to participate. Only individuals with relevant technical expertise can represent an organization in an investigation, and attorneys and insurance investigators are prohibited by law from participating.

The NTSB considers the party system crucial to the investigative process, as it provides the NTSB with access to individuals with specialized expertise or knowledge relevant to a particular investigation. However, the use of the party system is not without controversy. The NTSB invited Boeing to participate as a party to the investigation of the crash of TWA Flight 800, a Boeing 747, in 1996. While the NTSB relied on Boeing's sharing of expertise, it was later determined that Boeing had withheld a study of military versions of the 747 that investigated flammable vapor combustion in the center fuel tank. Boeing had told the NTSB that it had no studies proving or disproving the vapor combustion theory. In response to political pressure after the Boeing incident, the NTSB commissioned the nonprofit Rand Corporation to conduct an independent study of the NTSB's aircraft investigation process.

In 2000, Rand published its report, which concluded that the party system is "a key component of the NTSB investigative process" and that participant parties "are uniquely able to provide essential information about aircraft design and manufacture, airline operations, or functioning of [the National Airspace System] that simply cannot be obtained elsewhere". However, Rand also found conflicts of interest inherent in the party system, "may, in some instances, threaten the integrity of the NTSB investigative process". The Rand study recommended that the NTSB reduce its reliance on party representatives and make greater use of independent investigators, including from NASA, the Department of Defense, government research laboratories, and universities. , the NTSB has not adopted these recommendations and instead continues to rely on the party system.

Safety recommendations

, the NTSB has issued about 14,000 safety recommendations in its history, 73 percent of which have been adopted in whole or in part by the entities to which they were directed. Starting in 1990, the NTSB has annually published a "Most Wanted List", which highlights safety recommendations that the NTSB believes would provide the most significant — and sometimes immediate — benefit to the traveling public.

Among transportation safety improvements brought about or inspired by NTSB recommendations:

Aviation Mid-air collision avoidance technology, ground proximity warning systems, airborne wind shear detection and alert systems, smoke detectors in lavatories and fuel tank inerting.

Highway Graduated drivers license laws for young drivers, age-21 drinking laws, smart airbag technology, center high-mounted stop lights, commercial drivers licenses, and improved school bus construction standards.

Rail Positive train control, improved emergency exits for passenger rail cars, and double-shelf couplers for hazardous material rail cars.

Marine Recreational boating safety, improved fire safety on cruise ships, and lifesaving devices on fishing vessels.

Pipeline Excavation damage prevention, pipe corrosion protection, and remote shutoff valves.

Multi-Modal Alcohol and drug testing in all modes of transportation.

Other responsibilities

A less well-known responsibility of the NTSB is that it serves as a court of appeals for airmen, aircraft mechanics, certificated aviation-related companies, and mariners who have their licenses suspended or revoked by the FAA or the Coast Guard. The NTSB employs administrative law judges who initially hear all appeals, and the administrative law judge's ruling may be appealed to the five-member Board. The Board's determinations may be appealed to the federal court system by the losing party, whether it is the individual or company, on the one hand, or the FAA or the Coast Guard, on the other. However, from Ferguson v. NTSB, the NTSB's determinations are not overturned by the federal courts unless the NTSB abused its discretion or its determination is wholly unsupported by the evidence.

The Safety Board maintains a training academy in Ashburn, Virginia, where it conducts courses for its employees and professionals in other government agencies, foreign governments or private companies, in areas such as general accident investigation, specific elements of investigations like survival factors or human performance, or related matters like family affairs or media relations. The facility houses for training purposes the reconstruction of more than 90 feet of the TWA Flight 800 Boeing 747, which was recovered from the Atlantic Ocean after it crashed on July 17, 1996, following a fuel tank explosion. 

On February 22, 2021, the NTSB announced that the TWA Flight 800 recreation would be decommissioned on July 7, 2021. This decision comes as the lease for the Ashburn training center expires shortly. The NTSB indicated it is moving away from large-scale reconstructions like with TWA Flight 800 and towards using 3D scans to reconstruct accidents. Under an agreement made with the victims' families, when the reconstruction was retained as a training tool, the reconstruction was not allowed to be used as a public exhibit or put on display. For this reason, the NTSB is planning to dismantle and destroy the reconstruction.

See also

 Aviation safety
 Federal Bureau of Investigation
 List of pipeline accidents
 Operation Lifesaver
 School bus safety
 U.S. Chemical Safety and Hazard Investigation Board
 Vehicle inspection in the United States
 Work-related road safety in the United States
 Transportation safety in the United States

Other countries
 Australian Transport Safety Bureau – Australia (ATSB)
 Air Accidents Investigation Branch – United Kingdom (AAIB)
 Taiwan Transportation Safety Board – Taiwan (TTSB)
 German Federal Bureau of Aircraft Accident Investigation – Germany
 Bureau d'Enquêtes et d'Analyses pour la Sécurité de l'Aviation Civile – France
 Agenzia Nazionale per la Sicurezza del Volo – Italy (ANSV)
 Transport Accident Investigation Commission – New Zealand (TAIC)
 Transportation Safety Board of Canada – Canada (TSB)
 National Transportation Safety Committee – Indonesia (NTSC)
 Swedish Accident Investigation Authority - Sweden (SHK)
 European Network of Civil Aviation Safety Investigation Authorities - European Union (ENCASIA)
 Accident Investigation Board Denmark - Denmark (HCLJ)
 Japan Transport Safety Board - Japan (JTSB)

References

External links

NTSB Most Wanted List
National Transportation Safety Board on USAspending.gov
National Transportation Safety Board in the Federal Register
Records Management Oversight Inspection Report 2014; National Transportation Safety Board Records Management Program; National Archives and Records Administration; Issued December 19, 2014
  Rimson P.E., Ira J. Investigating "Causes".   International Society of Air Safety Investigators, ISASI '98, Barcelona, Spain; October 20, 1998.

 
Rail accident investigators
United States
Aviation in the United States
Government agencies established in 1967
Transport safety organizations
Organizations based in Washington, D.C.
1967 establishments in Washington, D.C.